Stražbenica may refer to:

 Stražbenica (Banovići), a village in Bosnia and Herzegovina
 Stražbenica (Kupres), a village in Bosnia and Herzegovina
 Stražbenica, Croatia, a village near Petrinja, Croatia

See also
 Stražbenice